Xi County or Xixian is a county in the southwest of Shanxi province, China. It is located in the northwest of the administrative area of the prefecture-level city of Linfen.

Toponymy 
The county was named after a definition in the Erya which stated "that which is wet shall be called xi", in reference to the county's wet period during the spring.

History 
During the Han dynasty, the area was organized as Puzi County.

Geography 

The , a tributary of the Yellow River, flows through the county.

Climate

Administrative divisions 
Xi County administers three towns and five townships.

Towns 

Townships 

Demographics 
The county's population per the 2010 Chinese Census was 103,617, up from the 95,895 reported in the 2000 Chinese Census. In 1999, the county's population was estimated to be 97,758.

References

County-level divisions of Shanxi
Linfen